Kilakkarai Lighthouse is located at Kilakkarai, Tamil Nadu. The lighthouse started functioning on 2 October 1979. There was no lighthouse at this location prior to the installation of the present structure. A flag mast was present at this location previously to assist fishermen. The light source was modified on 30 April 2003.

See also 

 List of lighthouses in India

References

External links 
 
 
 Directorate General of Lighthouses and Lightships

Lighthouses in Tamil Nadu
Ramanathapuram district
Lighthouses completed in 1979
1979 establishments in Tamil Nadu